Albantsi is a village in the municipality of Dzhebel, in Kardzhali Province, in southern-central Bulgaria. It covers an area of 0.807 square kilometres and as of 2007 it had a population of 2 people.

References

Villages in Kardzhali Province